This is a survey of the postage stamps and postal history of Serbia.

History

The Principality of Serbia began to issue its own stamps in 1866. Serbia was elevated to the status of a Kingdom in 1881.

World War I
During the First World War, the territory of Serbia was under Austro-Hungarian occupation. Stamps of Bosnia and Herzegovina overprinted "Serbien" were issued for Serbia.

Kingdom of Yugoslavia 

In 1920, its postal system was merged with the postal system of the former Austro-Hungarian territories with which it formed the Kingdom of Serbs, Croats and Slovenes, later the Kingdom of Yugoslavia.

World War II
After the Germans established the Government of National Salvation in 1941, it issued its own stamps until 1944. Initially, Yugoslavian stamps were simply overprinted in German with the word Serbien. Later regular issues were inscribed both Serbien and Србија (Serbia).

Post war
From 1944 onwards, Serbia was again part of Yugoslavia.

Modern Serbia

Upon the dissolution of the union of Serbia and Montenegro in 2006, Serbia began issuing its own stamps once more. The Post of Serbia issues the country's stamps.

References

Further reading
 Derocco, E. Istorija poštanskih maraka Srbije = History of the postage stamps of Serbia. 1973, 98p.
 Fleck, Vladimir. Die Briefmarken von Serbien. Frankfurt am Main: [Arbeitsgemeinschaft Neues Handbuch der Briefmarkenkunde], 1965, 31p.
 Kardosch, Velizar M. The Principality of Serbia : postal history and postage stamps, 1830-1882. Romanshorn: V.M. Kardosch, 1996 , 381p. 
 Rasic, Mirko R. The Postal History and Postage Stamps of Serbia. New York?: Pub. by The Theodore E. Steinway Memorial Publication Fund, 1979, 276p.
 Rodgers, E. W. The Serbian Stamp of Death. Brantford, Ont.: Canadian Wholesale Supply, 1977, 20p.
 Smeth, Paul de. Les Timbres de La Principauté de Serbie (1866 à 1880). Amiens: Yvert, 1927, 54p.
 Walshe, M. O'C. The Obrenovich Stamps of Serbia (1866-1904). London: Published by "Stamp Collecting," at the Vallancy Press, Ltd., 1929, 36p.

External links

Serbian Stamps 1941-1943

Communications in Serbia
Philately of Yugoslavia
Serbia